This list of St. Petersburg College alumni includes graduates, non-graduate former students, and current students of St. Petersburg College.

References

Lists of people by university or college in Florida